The Council of the Isles of Scilly is a sui generis authority in the ceremonial county of Cornwall, England, UK. It is elected every four years.

The Local Government Act 1888 allowed the Local Government Board to establish in the Isles of Scilly "councils and other local authorities separate from those of the county of Cornwall "... for the application to the islands of any act touching local government." Accordingly, in 1890 the Isles of Scilly Rural District Council (the RDC) was formed as a sui generis unitary authority, outside the administrative county of Cornwall. Cornwall County Council provided some services to the Isles, for which the RDC made financial contributions. The Isles of Scilly Order 1930 granted the Council the "powers, duties and liabilities" of a county council. Section 265 of the Local Government Act 1972 allowed for the continued existence of the RDC, but renamed as the Council of the Isles of Scilly.

Political control
The main national political parties do not routinely field candidates for elections to the Council of the Isles of Scilly. Since the 2009 elections, all but two of the candidates have been independents. Two Green Party candidates stood in 2013, but neither was elected. The elected council has therefore entirely comprised independent councillors since at least 2009.

Leadership
Political leadership is provided by the chairman of the council, unlike in other English local authorities where the chairman is a largely ceremonial role. The chairmen since 2009 have been:

Council elections
1973 Council of the Isles of Scilly election
1977 Council of the Isles of Scilly election
1979 Council of the Isles of Scilly election
1981 Council of the Isles of Scilly election
1985 Council of the Isles of Scilly election
1989 Council of the Isles of Scilly election
1993 Council of the Isles of Scilly election
1997 Council of the Isles of Scilly election
2001 Council of the Isles of Scilly election
2005 Council of the Isles of Scilly election
2009 Council of the Isles of Scilly election
2013 Council of the Isles of Scilly election
2017 Council of the Isles of Scilly election (reduction in number of seats from 21 to 16)
2021 Council of the Isles of Scilly election

By-elections

References

External links

 
Council elections in Cornwall
District council elections in England